Let's Sin is a 2014 Turkish action film directed by Onur Ünlü.

Cast 
 Serkan Keskin - Selman Bulut
 Hazal Kaya - Zeynep Bulut
 Öner Erkan - Gökhan
 Osman Sonant - Komiser Cihan Demir
 Büşra Pekin - Nebahat
  - Efraim
 Serdar Orçin - Ferdi

References

External links 

2014 action films
Turkish action films
Films shot in Istanbul